The East of Scotland Shield is a Scottish football trophy awarded by the East of Scotland Football Association. The only older cup competition in Scottish football is the Scottish Cup. The tournament is the third-oldest in world football still competed for annually, after the FA Cup and the Scottish Cup. The next oldest tournament in world football is the Sheffield and Hallamshire Senior Cup; the next oldest tournament in Scottish football is the Renfrewshire Cup.

The competition was initially known as the Edinburgh F.A. Cup. Hibernian won the Cup outright by winning it in three successive years from 1879 to 1881, which meant that it was renamed the East of Scotland Shield. It played a significant part in establishing Hibernian ("Hibs") and Heart of Midlothian ("Hearts") as the predominant football clubs in Edinburgh, as the 1878 Edinburgh Cup went to four replays and built interest in the two newly formed clubs.

The competition was a knockout tournament for football clubs based in Edinburgh and the surrounding area. Besides Hearts and Hibs, these clubs included Alloa Athletic, Armadale, Bathgate, Berwick Rangers, Bo'ness, Bonnyrigg Rose, Cowdenbeath, Edinburgh University, Leith Athletic, Lochgelly United, Meadowbank Thistle and St Bernard's.

Hearts and Hibs, traditionally the strongest clubs in the area, contested most of the finals. Declining attendances meant that the competition was no longer contested after 1989–90 as an adult-level cup. It continued as a youth tournament and was revived in 2004 as an annual one-off match between Hearts and Hibs youth teams, acting as a fundraiser for the East of Scotland Football Association.

Trophy 
A second trophy was commissioned in 1882 to the replace the original. The centrepiece of the Shield depicted a scene from the England v Scotland match at the Oval in 1875 that was published by Illustrated Sporting and Dramatic News that year (and again in 1879). The only difference was they flipped the goal so it was on the right.

Winners 
The following list is incomplete.

List of winners
As senior competition (to 1990):
Heart of Midlothian: 52 wins
Hibernian: 47 wins
Berwick Rangers: 2 wins
Mossend Swifts: 2 wins
3rd E.R.V.: 1 win
St Bernard's: 1 win
Leith Athletic: 1 win
Bo'ness: 1 win
Edinburgh University: 1 win
Edinburgh Thistle: 1 win

As Non First XI competition (since 1990, Mixture of Reserve, U21, U18 and Youth results. Record incomplete):
Hibernian youths: 12 wins
Heart of Midlothian youths: 8 wins

See also
Glasgow Cup
Rosebery Charity Cup
Wilson Cup (football)

References

Sources

External links
 Hearts in EoSS (full results summary) at London Hearts Supporters Club
 East of Scotland Shield (full results) at Scottish Football Historical Archive

Football cup competitions in Scotland
Edinburgh football competitions
Recurring sporting events established in 1875
1875 establishments in Scotland